The 14th Infantry Brigade was a formation of the Royal Hungarian Army that participated in the Axis invasion of Yugoslavia during World War II.

Organization 
April 1941

14th Infantry Brigade (Szeged):
 9. Infantry Regiment (Szeged): Colonel Laszlo Deak
I. Battalion (Szeged); II. Battalion (Csongrád); III. Battalion (Hódmezővásárhely)
 14. Field Artillery Division (Szeged): Colonel Frederick Miklay

The 14. Infantry Brigade redesignated 14. Light Division 17 February 1942.

Commanders
14th Infantry Brigade
 Brigadier General Antal Silley  (23 Jan 1939 - 1 Aug 1939)
 Brigadier General Marcell Stomm  (1 Aug 1939 - 17 Feb 1942)
14th Light Division
 Brigadier General Marcell Stomm  (17 Feb 1942 - ? Oct 1942)
 Brigadier General Zontán Kozma  (? Oct 1942 - 10 Aug 1943)

Notes

References
 

Military units and formations of Hungary in World War II